Salem Township is one of twelve townships in Delaware County, Indiana. According to the 2010 census, its population was 4,034 and it contained 1,729 housing units.

History
The Richwood Evangelical Lutheran Church was listed on the National Register of Historic Places in 2004.

Geography

Cities and towns
 Chesterfield (east edge)
 Daleville

Unincorporated towns
 Cross Roads

Adjacent townships
 Mount Pleasant Township (north)
 Center Township (northeast)
 Monroe Township (east)
 Jefferson Township, Henry County (southeast)
 Fall Creek Township, Henry County (south)
 Union Township, Madison County (west)
 Richland Township, Madison County (northwest)

Major highways
  Interstate 69
  State Road 32
  State Road 67

Cemeteries
The township contains three cemeteries: Saunders, Sharp and Sunderland.

References
 United States Census Bureau cartographic boundary files
 U.S. Board on Geographic Names

External links
 Indiana Township Association
 United Township Association of Indiana
Old Salem Township historic information

Townships in Delaware County, Indiana
Townships in Indiana